Bodinus is a surname. Notable people with the surname include:

 Sebastian Bodinus ( 1700–1759), German composer
 Heinrich Bodinus (1814–1884), German zoologist
 Jean Bodin (Latinized) (1530–1596), French jurist and philosopher